Ogre is a 1986 computer game based on the Ogre board wargame. It was released by Origin Systems for the Apple II, Amiga, Atari 8-bit family, Atari ST, Commodore 64, MS-DOS, and Macintosh.

Reception

inCider in 1986 rated Ogre with three stars out of four. Info gave the Commodore 64 version three-plus stars out of five, stating that "the real fun is you against the computer" despite the "limited" graphics and sound. The magazine approved of the user interface, and recommended the "very nice" game to those new to battle simulations. M. Evan Brooks reviewed the game for Computer Gaming World, and stated that "even though Ogre is a faithful adaptation of its parent boardgame, has adequate graphics, and can be fun, it isn't the bargain [...] that the boardgame was".

Computer Gaming World rated Ogre three stars out of five in a 1992 survey of science fiction games and two-plus stars in a 1994 survey, and ranked it #130 in the magazine's 1996 list of 150 Best Games of All Time.

Tim Robinson reviewed Ogre in Space Gamer/Fantasy Gamer No. 81. Robinson commented that "This is a great game, well worth buying and playing extensively. The computer Ogre is great competition and there are options to play against a human opponent. I can highly recommend this game."

Reviews
 Casus Belli #43 (Feb 1988)
Isaac Asimov's Science Fiction Magazine v11 n10 (1987 10)

References

External links
 
 Ogre for the Atari ST at Atari Mania
 Ogre for the Atari 8-bit family at Atari Mania
Review in ANALOG Computing
Review in InCider
Review in Info
Review in Hardcore Computist
Article in Tilt (French)

1986 video games
Amiga games
Apple II games
Atari 8-bit family games
Atari ST games
Classic Mac OS games
Commodore 64 games
DOS games
Origin Systems games
Tank simulation video games
Video games based on board games
Video games developed in the United States